2007 Monaco GP2 Series round was a GP2 Series motor race held on 26 May 2007 at the Circuit de Monaco in Monte Carlo, Monaco. It was the third race of the 2007 GP2 Series. The race was used to support the 2007 Monaco Grand Prix.

Classification

Qualifying

Feature race

References

Monaco Gp2 Round, 2007
Monaco
Motorsport in Monaco